Townsend (pronounced tounʹ-zənd) or Townshend may refer to:

Places

United States
Camp Townsend, National Guard training base in Peekskill, New York
Townsend, Delaware
Townsend, Georgia
Townsend, Massachusetts, a New England town
Townsend (CDP), Massachusetts, the main village in the town
Townsend Harbor, Massachusetts, another village in the town
Townsend, Montana
Townsend Township, Huron County, Ohio
Townsend Township, Sandusky County, Ohio
Townsend, Tennessee
Townsend, Wisconsin, a town
Townsend (community), Wisconsin, an unincorporated community 
Townshend, Vermont, a New England town
Townshend (CDP), Vermont, the main village in the town
Port Townsend, Washington
Port Townsend Bay
Port Townsend Film Festival

Canada
 Townsend Township, Ontario
 Townsend, Ontario
 Townsend Lake, Saskatchewan

United Kingdom
Townsend, Buckinghamshire
Townshend, Cornwall
Townsend, Bournemouth, Dorset
Townsend, Poulshot, Wiltshire
Townsend, Kingswinford, an area at the end of the village of Kingswinford in the West Midlands
Townsend Industrial Estate in Houghton Regis, near Dunstable in Bedfordshire

New Zealand
 Townsend Observatory

Australia
Mount Townsend, the second-highest peak in mainland Australia
 the name of Marburg, Queensland for a brief period during World War 1

Buildings and structures
 Townsend Central Public School, Norfolk County, Ontario, Canada
 Townsend Hotel (Birmingham, Michigan)
 Townsend Hotel (Casper, Wyoming), a NRHP-listed property
 Townshend International School, Hluboká nad Vltavou, Czech Republic
 Townsend & Wall, former department store in St. Joseph, Missouri from 1866 to 1983, now used as apartments
 Townsend Building (disambiguation), several buildings
 James W. Townsend House (Orange Springs, Florida)
 James W. Townsend House (Lake Butler, Florida)

History
 Townshend Acts, proposed by Charles Townshend, Chancellor of the Exchequer, that placed a tax on common import goods and which fomented resentment of the British in the Thirteen Colonies

Science
 Townsend discharge
 Townsend (unit)

Other uses
 Townsend (name)
 Townsend and Townsend and Crew, law firm established in 1860, based in San Francisco, California
 Townsend Thoresen, past ferry operator, now named P&O Ferries
 Townsend v. Sain, a US Supreme Court case about habeas corpus and truth serums, decided in 1963